Mesnilisca is a genus of flies in the family Tachinidae. It is only known from Tajikistan.

Species
M. trivittata Zimin, 1931

References

Tachininae
Tachinidae genera